Ardanuç is a town in Artvin Province in Turkey's Black Sea region of Turkey, 32 km east of Artvin. The name Ardanuç derives from Lazuri language and Armenian (lit. "edge of Ardahan” in Lazuri and “Ard” meaning field in Armenian"). It is the seat of Ardanuç District. Its population is 5,470 (2021).

History 
The history of this area goes back to the settlement of the banks of the Çoruh River by the Hurri and Mitanni branches of the Hittites in 2000 BC. The first mention of Ardanuç was in a Urartu monument to the defeat of the local people in battle by King Sarduri II in 753 BC. Then in the 7th century BC the Saka or Scythians are known to have settled and they dominated Artanuj. From the 2nd century BC to the 4th century AD this region formed a part of Greater Armenia. The castle of Artanuj was built by Georgian king Vakhtang Gorgasali (5th century AD). The  castle  was besieged by Arab caliph Marwan II (688-750) Umayyad in 744 AD. and was restored by Ashot I Bagrationi in the 8th century. He also founded a city, which became the center of the "Kingdom of Georgians" of Tao-Klarjeti.

Fighting between the Bagrationi and Anatolian beyliks began in 1080. Artanuj being a mountain stronghold was hard to capture, although it did fall to the Mongols during their wars with the Turks and Georgians in the 13th century and was brought into the Ottoman Empire in 1551 by Suleiman the Magnificent following yet another siege, this time to overturn the local ruler, Atabeg of Samtskhe Jakeli.

Following the Russo-Turkish War (1877-1878) Artanuj/Ardanuç was ceded to Russia. During the early stages of the First World War, Ottoman irregular forces carried out massacres of the local Armenian and other members of the Christian population.

After the Russian Revolution Artanuj became part of Democratic Republic of Georgia. The young state placed itself under German protection and ceded its largely Muslim-inhabited regions (including the cities of Batum, Ardahan, Artvin, Akhaltsikhe and Akhalkalaki) to the Ottoman government (Treaty of Batum, June 4). Following the end of the war, in 1920 Georgia regained control over Artvin, Ardahan, Akhaltsikhe and Akhalkalaki. However, after the Red Army's invasion of Georgia, the region was occupied by the newly formed Republic of Turkey.

Iskender Pasha Mosque
The Iskender Pasha Mosque and Tombs (İskender Paşa Camii ve Türbeleri) was commissioned by Iskender Pasha and opened in 1553. It is built in a classical Ottoman style and has four domes. It also contains the tombs of  Hatice Hanım, Ali Pasha and Süleyman Pasha.

Geography 
Other high mountains are Kürdevan, Yalnızçam and Mount Horasan. The town of Ardanuç is on the western side of Yalnızçam Mount and at the conjunction of Bulanık, Aydın and Horhot streams.

Climate 
Ardanuç has an oceanic climate (Köppen: Cfb).

References

External links 

 the Municipality
  Photographic survey and plan of Ardanuç Castle

Populated places in Artvin Province
Tao-Klarjeti
Bagratid Iberia
Ardanuç District
Towns in Turkey
Batum Oblast